Sir Harold Otto Danckwerts  (23 February 1888 – 12 June 1978) was a lawyer, then senior judge of England and Wales (1949-1969).

Career
One of three sons and one daughter of William Otto Adolph Julius Danckwerts (German, but raised in South Africa and naturalised British) and Mary Caroline Lowther, Danckwerts was educated at Winchester College, Balliol College, Oxford, and Harvard University. He was called to the bar by Lincoln's Inn in 1913. In World War I he served with the East Riding of Yorkshire Yeomanry and the Machine Gun Corps, achieving the rank of Captain, and was mentioned in despatches.

He was appointed a Justice of the Chancery Division of the High Court of England and Wales on 1 June 1949, and received the customary knighthood shortly after. He was promoted to be a Lord Justice of Appeal in the Court of Appeal of England and Wales on 9 January 1961. Following that he was made a member of the Privy Council of the United Kingdom (principally entitling him to the prefix of Rt. Hon. and to sit in its overseas-remitted judicial final appeal hearings). He retired from his judicial offices on 2 June 1969.

Personal life
His first marriage was in East Yorkshire in 1918; his second in London in 1969.

References

20th-century English judges
1888 births
Knights Bachelor
Lords Justices of Appeal
Chancery Division judges
Members of the Privy Council of the United Kingdom
1978 deaths
English people of German descent
People educated at Winchester College
Alumni of Balliol College, Oxford
Harvard University alumni
Members of Lincoln's Inn
British Army personnel of World War I
East Riding of Yorkshire Yeomanry officers